Take a Chance is an American game show that aired live on NBC on Sunday night from October 1, 1950, to December 24, 1950. The show was hosted by film actor Don Ameche.

Format
Contestants were chosen from the studio audience and given five dollars. The contestant was then asked a series of four questions. If the first question was answered correctly, they kept the five dollars. Other correct answers were worth other winnings. The contestant could quit whenever they no longer wanted to "Take a Chance". If all four questions were answered correctly, the contestant got a chance at the jackpot question worth a thousand dollars.

References

External links
 Take a Chance on IMDb

1950 American television series debuts
1950 American television series endings
1950s American game shows
NBC original programming
American live television series